The Barabuna tree frog (Litoria contrastens) is a species of frog in the subfamily Pelodryadinae. 

It is endemic to Papua New Guinea. 

Its natural habitats are swamps and rural gardens. It is threatened by habitat loss.

Taxonomy 
Litoria contrastens is part of the species-group L. bicolor, which was created to accommodate 7 species from the region that had characteristics in common.

The other members of the group are: Litoria cooloolensis and Litoria fallax in Australia; Litoria bicolor in Austrália and Papua New Guine; Litoria bibonius, Litoria longicrus and Litoria mystax in Papua New Guine.

References

Litoria
Amphibians of Papua New Guinea
Amphibians described in 1968
Taxonomy articles created by Polbot